Jefferson Poirot (born 1 November 1992) is a French rugby union player. His position is prop and he currently plays for Bordeaux Bègles in the Top 14.
He was named in the French squad for the 2016 Six Nations Championship.	
	
Poirot was born in France, to a Nigerian father and French mother.

International tries

References

External links
France profile at FFR
 

1992 births
Living people
People from L'Isle-Adam, Val-d'Oise
Sportspeople from Val-d'Oise
French people of Nigerian descent
French rugby union players
France international rugby union players
Rugby union props
Union Bordeaux Bègles players
CA Brive players